Peromyia is a genus of wood midges in the family Cecidomyiidae. There are 203 described species in Peromyia. The genus was established by Jean-Jacques Kieffer in 1894.

See also
 List of Peromyia species

References

Cecidomyiidae genera

Taxa named by Jean-Jacques Kieffer
Insects described in 1894